Scott Huffaker II (born December 28, 1999) is an American racing driver who competes in the IMSA SportsCar Championship, European Le Mans Series, and FIA World Endurance Championship.

Career

Early career
After attending a number of races at a local BMX circuit as a spectator, Huffaker was encouraged to race by a track employee, leading to his maiden experience in motorsports. Huffaker began his racing career in BMX bikes at the age of five, quickly advancing through the ranks and winning at the BMX Grand Nationals two years later. Following this success, he began to transition into karting, winning two karting championships before he turned 13. Between 2010 and 2011, he raced nearly every weekend, adding up to a total of 104 races over the two-year stretch. In 2014, Huffaker graduated to single-seater competition, taking part in the SBF2000 Summer Series. The following year, he completed his first full-time campaign, racing in and winning the Pacific Formula F1600 championship. For 2016, he advanced to the Formula F2000 championship, claiming his first victory at Sonoma in July. Following this season, Huffaker and new team PR1/Mathiasen Motorsports began preparations to enter Formula 4 competition, competing in the Formula Pro USA F4 Championship in 2018. Winning 10 of 12 races, Huffaker claimed the series championship. At the end of the season, he took part in the series finale for the US F4 Championship, finishing as high as sixth in the first race of the weekend.

Sports car racing

In 2019, Huffaker continued with PR1/Mathiasen Motorsports, however began competing in sports car racing rather than single seaters. He took on a drive in the IMSA Prototype Challenge, piloting a Ligier JS P3 alongside Mike Guasch and later Chris Archinaco. Huffaker claimed one podium in 2019, finishing second at Mosport behind eventual series champions Austin McCusker and Rodrigo Pflucker. After that race, Huffaker was nominated to take part in the Team USA Scholarship shootout at Road America, where he'd compete for the chance to race in the Formula Ford Festival and Walter Hayes Trophy events in England. Following the shootout, Huffaker and Josh Green were awarded the scholarship, and traveled to England to take part in the two events with Cliff Dempsey Racing. Huffaker began his Walter Hayes Trophy campaign with a victory in his heat race, taking advantage of a collision between leaders Joey Foster and Michael Moyers. He then scored a victory in his semi-final event, before claiming third in the overall final. 

In 2020, Huffaker moved to the IMSA SportsCar Championship with PR1, joining the team's LMP2 program ahead of the Grand Prix at Road Atlanta. Joining Simon Trummer and Patrick Kelly, the team won the pole, scored the fastest lap in the LMP2 class, and took a class victory. Huffaker would return to the team for the remainder of the endurance events in 2020, and scored his second series victory in the season-ending 12 Hours of Sebring. Huffaker returned in his endurance role in 2021, joining the team for the entire Michelin Endurance Cup. Huffaker was part of three podium finishes in his four races, including his second consecutive class victory at the 12 Hours of Sebring. The team's performance was enough to secure the Michelin Endurance Cup title. At the end of 2021, Huffaker traveled to Bahrain to take part in the WEC Rookie Test, where he piloted an Aston Martin Vantage GTE. Huffaker once again reprised his endurance role in 2022, as PR1's #52 scaled back to an endurance-only IMSA campaign. Alongside Mikkel Jensen and Ben Keating, Huffaker claimed his third consecutive victory at Sebring, and added another at Watkins Glen, once again scoring the Michelin Endurance Cup title in the LMP2 class.

In 2023, Huffaker pivoted to fellow LMP2 competitor TDS Racing, joining Jensen and Steven Thomas. Huffaker also embarked on a double program with Kessel Racing, taking on the FIA World Endurance Championship and European Le Mans Series in a Ferrari 488 GTE.

Personal life
Huffaker attended Menlo-Atherton High School and the University of Colorado Boulder, studying mechanical engineering.

Racing record

Career summary

* Season still in progress.

Complete IMSA SportsCar Championship results
(key) (Races in bold indicate pole position; races in italics indicate fastest lap)

Complete FIA World Endurance Championship results
(key) (Races in bold indicate pole position; races in italics indicate fastest lap)

* Season still in progress.

References

External links
Scott Huffaker at IMSA
Scott Huffaker at Autosport

1999 births
Living people
American racing drivers
Racing drivers from California
United States F4 Championship drivers
WeatherTech SportsCar Championship drivers
Le Mans Cup drivers
TDS Racing drivers
24 Hours of Daytona drivers
FIA World Endurance Championship drivers
European Le Mans Series drivers
People from Menlo Park, California
Formula Ford drivers